An acid test is any qualitative chemical or metallurgical assay which uses acid; most commonly, and historically, the use of a strong acid to distinguish gold from base metals. Figuratively, acid test is any definitive test for some attribute, e.g. of a person's character, or of the performance of a product.

Chemistry
Testing for gold with acid focuses on the fact that gold is a noble metal which is resistant to change by corrosion, oxidation, or acid. The acid test for gold is to rub the gold-colored item on black stone, which will leave an easily visible mark. The mark is tested by applying nitric acid, which dissolves the mark of any item that is not gold. If the mark remains, it is tested by applying aqua regia (nitric acid and hydrochloric acid). If the mark is removed, then this test dissolves the gold, proving the item to be genuine gold. More accurate testing of the item for its fineness or purity can be done through the use of differing strengths of aqua regia and comparative testing of gold items of known fineness.

Figurative meanings
The figurative meaning of the expression, where it is applied to tests of character, or definitive tests to other materials, became popular during and after the California Gold Rush, but was current before then, as shown by this quote from the Wisconsin paper The Columbia Reporter, November 1845: "Twenty-four years of service demonstrates his ability to stand the acid test, as Gibson’s Soap Polish has done for over thirty years."

Other examples of the figurative use of the phrase are the web sites Acid1, Acid2 and Acid3, which are designed to test web browsers for compliance with current web standards. Another example is the quick ratio method, nicknamed "acid test", used by financial analysts to assess the liquidity of a business.

The use of the term "acid test" for experiences with the psychedelic drug LSD was popularised by the Merry Pranksters, and derives from the drug's common name, "acid".

References 

Chemical tests
Gold rushes
California Gold Rush